The 2022–23 Adelaide 36ers season was the 42nd season of the franchise in the National Basketball League (NBL).

On 2 October 2022, the 36ers became the first NBL team to beat an NBA team when they defeated the Phoenix Suns.

Roster

Standings

Ladder 

The NBL tie-breaker system as outlined in the NBL Rules and Regulations states that in the case of an identical win–loss record, the overall points percentage will determine order of seeding.

Ladder progression

Game log

Pre-season 

|-style="background:#FFBBBB;"
| 1
| 9 September
| @ Perth
| L 98–87
| Antonius Cleveland (23)
| Kai Sotto (11)
| Marshall, Randall II (4)
| Eaton Recreration Centre300
| 0–1
|-style="background:#FFBBBB;"
| 2
| 11 September
| @ Perth
| L 97–91
| Craig Randall II (29)
| Antonius Cleveland (9)
| Mitch McCarron (6)
| HBF Arena500
| 0–2

|-style="background:#BBF3BB;"
| 3
| 2 October
| @ Phoenix
| W 134–124
| Craig Randall II (35)
| Mitch McCarron (9)
| Mitch McCarron (16)
| Footprint Center15,152
| 1–2
|-style="background:#FFBBBB;"
| 4
| 6 October
| @ Oklahoma City
| L 98–131
| Craig Randall II (27)
| Robert Franks (7)
| Craig Randall II (8)
| Paycom Centernot available
| 1–3

NBL Blitz 

|-style="background:#BBF3BB;"
| 1
| 16 September
| @ S.E. Melbourne
| W 76–84
| Craig Randall II (16) 
| Mitch McCarron (8)
| Mitch McCarron (5)
| Darwin Basketball Facilitynot available
| 1–0
|-style="background:#BBF3BB;"
| 2
| 19 September
| Tasmania
| W 87–79
| Antonius Cleveland (27)
| Sunday Dech (9)
| Cleveland, Dech, McCarron (3)
| Darwin Basketball Facility838
| 2–0
|-style="background:#BBF3BB;"
| 3
| 22 September
| @ Illawarra
| W 77–84
| Robert Franks (30)
| Daniel Johnson (11)
| Sunday Dech (7)
| Darwin Basketball Facility912
| 3–0

Regular season 

|-style="background:#FFBBBB;"
| 1
| 13 October
| Tasmania
| L 72–97
| Craig Randall II (18)
| Mitch McCarron (6)
| Mitch McCarron (5)
| Adelaide Entertainment Centre8,027
| 0–1
|-style="background:#BBF3BB;"
| 2
| 15 October
| Illawarra
| W 90–80
| Craig Randall II (28)
| Robert Franks (9)
| Daniel Johnson (8)
| Adelaide Entertainment Centre8,143
| 1–1
|-style="background:#BBF3BB;"
| 3
| 21 October
| @ Sydney
| W 88–92
| Craig Randall II (24)
| Daniel Johnson (8)
| Craig Randall II (5)
| Qudos Bank Arena8,154
| 2–1
|-style="background:#FFBBBB;"
| 4
| 28 October
| New Zealand
| L 70–99
| Kai Sotto (16)
| Kai Sotto (7)
| Dech, McCarron (3)
| Adelaide Entertainment Centre6,717
| 2–2
|-style="background:#FFBBBB;"
| 5
| 30 October
| @ S.E. Melbourne
| L 103–98 (OT)
| Craig Randall II (28)
| Franks, McCarron (9)
| Cleveland, Franks, Randall (3)
| John Cain Arena7,195
| 2–3

|-style="background:#BBF3BB;"
| 6
| 3 November
| @ Illawarra
| W 80–96
| Daniel Johnson (28)
| Daniel Johnson (7)
| Mitch McCarron (7)
| WIN Entertainment Centre2,118
| 3–3
|-style="background:#FFBBBB;"
| 7
| 5 November
| Perth
| L 89–94
| Robert Franks (24)
| Robert Franks (9)
| Daniel Johnson (5)
| Adelaide Entertainment Centre9,071
| 3–4
|-style="background:#BBF3BB;"
| 8
| 17 November
| @ Melbourne
| W 86–91
| Drmic, Franks (21)
| Robert Franks (11)
| Mitch McCarron (5)
| John Cain Arena5,100
| 4–4
|-style="background:#FFBBBB;"
| 9
| 20 November
| @ New Zealand
| L 89–83
| Antonius Cleveland (17)
| Mitch McCarron (9)
| Antonius Cleveland (6)
| The Trusts Arena2,909
| 4–5
|-style="background:#BBF3BB;"
| 10
| 24 November 
| @ Perth
| W 82–96
| Robert Franks (21)
| Franks, Johnson (8)
| Drmic, McCarron (6)
| RAC Arena10,329
| 5–5

|-style="background:#BBF3BB;"
| 11
| 2 December
| Cairns
| W 78–75
| Antonius Cleveland (23)
| Daniel Johnson (9)
| Sunday Dech (5)
| Adelaide Entertainment Centre7,198
| 6–5
|-style="background:#FFBBBB;"
| 12
| 4 December
| @ Sydney
| L 97–78
| Daniel Johnson (21)
| Antonius Cleveland (6)
| Mitch McCarron (5)
| Qudos Bank Arena9,389
| 6–6
|-style="background:#FFBBBB;"
| 13
| 9 December
| Perth
| L 90–98
| Mitch McCarron (20)
| Mitch McCarron (13)
| Mitch McCarron (6)
| Adelaide Entertainment Centre5,436
| 6–7
|-style="background:#FFBBBB;"
| 14
| 11 December
| @ S.E. Melbourne
| L 102–84
| Robert Franks (18)
| Mitch McCarron (9)
| Mitch McCarron (4)
| John Cain Arena4,820
| 6–8
|-style="background:#BBF3BB;"
| 15
| 17 December
| Brisbane
| W 108–77
| Robert Franks (25)
| Antonius Cleveland (9)
| Dech, McCarron (4)
| Adelaide Entertainment Centre6,003
| 7–8
|-style="background:#BBF3BB;"
| 16
| 19 December
| Tasmania
| W 93–82
| Antonius Cleveland (20)
| Antonius Cleveland (10)
| Mitch McCarron (5)
| Adelaide Entertainment Centre7,010
| 8–8
|-style="background:#BBF3BB;"
| 17
| 24 December
| S.E. Melbourne
| W 94–88
| Franks, Johnson (20)
| Antonius Cleveland (11)
| Antonius Cleveland (5)
| Adelaide Entertainment Centre6,033
| 9–8
|-style="background:#BBF3BB;"
| 18
| 29 December
| Brisbane
| W 87–84
| Robert Franks (18)
| Anthony Drmic (11)
| Antonius Cleveland (5)
| Adelaide Entertainment Centre9,263
| 10–8
|-style="background:#FFBBBB;"
| 19
| 31 December
| @ Cairns
| L 86–83
| Antonius Cleveland (16)
| Robert Franks (8)
| Mitch McCarron (5)
| Cairns Convention Centre4,851
| 10–9

|-style="background:#BBF3BB;"
| 20
| 6 January
| Illawarra
| W 103–95
| Daniel Johnson (18)
| Daniel Johnson (8)
| Clark, Cleveland (5)
| Adelaide Entertainment Centre9,308
| 11–9
|-style="background:#FFBBBB;"
| 21
| 8 January
| New Zealand
| L 83–85
| Robert Franks (20)
| Robert Franks (13)
| Mitch McCarron (4)
| Adelaide Entertainment Centre9,368
| 11–10
|-style="background:#FFBBBB;"
| 22
| 12 January
| @ Tasmania
| L 98–82
| Robert Franks (24)
| Kai Sotto (7)
| Ian Clark (6)
| MyState Bank Arena4,293
| 11–11
|-style="background:#FFBBBB;"
| 23
| 14 January 
| @ Perth
| L 112–97
| Robert Franks (25)
| Antonius Cleveland (6)
| Antonius Cleveland (4)
| RAC Arena13,087
| 11–12
|-style="background:#FFBBBB;"
| 24
| 19 January
| @ Brisbane
| L 106–101 (OT)
| Anthony Drmic (20)
| Harris, Sotto (7)
| Ian Clark (8)
| Nissan Arena3,953
| 11–13
|-style="background:#FFBBBB;"
| 25
| 21 January
| Melbourne
| L 87–94
| Robert Franks (24)
| Robert Franks (10)
| Robert Franks (6)
| Adelaide Entertainment Centre9,505
| 11–14
|-style="background:#BBF3BB;"
| 26
| 30 January 
| @ Cairns
| W 96–99
| Antonius Cleveland (27)
| Robert Franks (9)
| Franks, McCarron (5)
| Cairns Convention Centre3,530
| 12–14

|-style="background:#BBF3BB;"
| 27
| 3 February 
| Sydney
| W 115–108
| Antonius Cleveland (23)
| Kai Sotto (7)
| Antonius Cleveland (7)
| Adelaide Entertainment Centre9,558
| 13–14
|-style="background:#FFBBBB;"
| 28
| 5 February
| @ Melbourne
| L 116–107
| Antonius Cleveland (30)
| Antonius Cleveland (6)
| Clark, Dech (4)
| John Cain Arena10,175
| 13–15

Transactions

Re-signed

Additions

Subtractions

Awards

Club awards 
 Most Improved: Nick Marshall
 Coaches Award: Anthony Drmic
 Members Choice: Antonius Cleveland
 Best Defensive Player: Antonius Cleveland
 Chairman's Award: Jared Campbell
 Club MVP: Antonius Cleveland

See also 
 2022–23 NBL season
 Adelaide 36ers

References

External links 

 Official Website

Adelaide 36ers
Adelaide 36ers seasons
Adelaide 36ers season